Iris nigricans is a flowering plant in the family Iridaceae. It is the national flower of Jordan. It needs direct sun and sharp drainage. It is endemic to Jordan and is an endangered species. 

There are 8 other irises native to Jordan, and most of these are also endangered. The black species are sometimes confused with Iris nigricans.
Iris vartanii - Vartanii Iris - light blue flowers - extinct in Jordan
Iris atrofusca - Jil'ad Iris - black flowers - endangered
Iris atropurpurea - Purple Iris - black flowers - cultivated but vulnerable in the wild
Iris petrana - Petra Iris - black flowers
Iris germanica - German Iris - purple flowers
Iris postii - Post Iris - purple flowers
Iris edomensis - Edom iris - white flowers with black spots - endangered
Iris aucheri - Desert Iris - various colors

References

nigricans
Flora of Jordan
Flora of Palestine (region)
Endangered flora of Asia
Garden plants of Asia
Plants described in 1933
Taxa named by John Edward Dinsmore